Asida (Arabic "عصيدة", Maghrebi "Ġsydë" [ˈʕs(ˁ)iːdə]) is a common dish in the Arab world. It is a lump of dough, obtained by stirring wheat flour into boiling water, sometimes with added butter or honey. Similar in texture to fufu, it is eaten in mainly in Middle East and African  countries. It is considered one of the most popular desserts and traditional dishes in many Arab countries.

Asida is particularly popular in Morocco, Sudan, Libya, Algeria,Tunisia, Ethiopia, Eritrea, and the rest of the Middle East. Often served during religious holidays such as Mawlid and Eid, it is also served during other traditional ceremonies, for example accompanying the birth of child, such as the ‘aqīqah, the cutting of the hair of a newborn seven days after birth.

A simple, yet rich dish, often eaten without other complementary dishes, it is traditionally served at breakfast and is also given to women in labor.

Etymology
The word asida is an Arabic word that is derived from the root عصد (asad), meaning 'twist it'.

History
One of the earliest documented recipes for asida is found in a tenth century Arabic cookbook by Ibn Sayyar al-Warraq called  Kitab al-Ṭabīḫ (The Book of Dishes). It was described as a thick pudding of dates cooked with clarified butter (samn). A recipe for asida was also mentioned in an anonymous Hispano-Muslim cookbook dating to the 13th century. In the 13th and 14th centuries, in the mountainous region of the Rif along the Mediterranean coast of Morocco, a flour made from lightly grilled barley was used in place of wheat flour. A recipe for asida that adds argan seed oil was documented by Leo Africanus (c. 1465–1550), the Arab explorer known as Hasan al-Wazan in the Arab world. According to the French scholar Maxime Rodinson, asida were typical foods among the Bedouin of pre-Islamic and, probably, later times.

Variations

Morocco 
In the old city of Fez, vendors sell squares of cold semolina pudding sprinkled with sugar and cinnamon, usually consumed by children after school.

Libya 
The Libyan variation of asida is served with a sweet syrup, usually date or carob syrup (rub), but also with honey. As well as melted butter around the asida itself.

Tunisia 
The Tunisian version of this dish is served with either a mixture of honey and butter or a hot chili pepper paste  (harissa). The latter is more common later in the day and the former earlier. Asida is also commonly consumed with carob syrup or date syrup in southern parts of Tunisia.

Yemen 

Aseedah or aseed is one of the staple dishes in Yemen and is usually served for lunch, dinner, or breakfast. Its ingredients include wholemeal wheat, boiling water, and salt as needed.

A pot of water is placed on high heat until boiling. Slowly, handfuls of wholemeal wheat are added and then mixed quickly with a large wooden spoon to avoid forming lumps. The process is repeated until the mixture is very thick. Traditionally the cook lowers the pot to the floor where they hold the pot with their feet and stir vigorously. Finally, the hot, steaming dough is shaped using bare oiled hands and usually placed in a wide, wooden bowl.

Sometimes a depression is made in the middle of the shaped Aseedah into which a hot chili tomato paste can be added or Helba, a fenugreek mixture made with parsley and garlic. Lamb or a chicken stock is then poured around the Aseedah. It is then served hot.

Aseedah can also be made using white, bleached wheat. Furthermore, honey can be used instead of stock and chili/Helba. It is a meal, using only boiled water, flour, and some salt. Typically it is smothered in beef soup or chicken or even lamb.

It is usually served to boil hot and eaten with hands or spoons. Aseed is eaten particularly at lunchtime and during Ramadan.

Eritrea 

The Eritrean version of asida is called Ga’at in Tigrinya. Eritrean ghee called tesmi snd berbere ) are poured into a hole in the middle. It is eaten after childbirth and also often eaten as breakfast. Some tribes serve it with butter and honey.

Ethiopia 

The Ethiopian version of this is called Genfo in Amharic. It is served with Ethiopian ghee called niter kibbeh, berbere (an Ethiopian spice mix), yogurt, or even milk. This dish is served as a breakfast.

See also

 List of Middle Eastern dishes
 Arab cuisine
 Berber cuisine
 Indonesian cuisine
 List of puddings
 Fufu
 Genfo
 Kue asida

References

Further reading

External links
Flickr image

Wheat dishes
Puddings
Arab cuisine
Indonesian cuisine
Libyan cuisine
Saudi Arabian cuisine
Sudanese cuisine
Tunisian cuisine
Yemeni cuisine
Middle Eastern cuisine